Sanya (Sanya City) is a city in Hainan, China.

Sanya may also refer to:

Places
 Sanya Bay a bay in the county of Sanya City, Hainan, China
 San'ya, a place in Tokyo, Japan
 San'ya Station, Ōta, Tokyo, Japan; former name of rail station Ōmorimachi Station

People
 Sanya (name)

Fictional characters
 Sanya V. Litvyak, a character in the Strike Witches anime
Sanya, a character in The Dresden Files

Other uses
 Sanya (Sitcom), an Indian sitcom.

See also

 San (disambiguation)
 Ya (disambiguation)
 Sanja (disambiguation)
 Sania (name)